The following article features the complete discography of the upstate New York based post-hardcore/indie rock band Polar Bear Club.

Studio albums

Live albums

Extended plays

Music videos

Demos

Discographies of American artists
Punk rock group discographies